Aunt Zelda may refer to:

 Zelda Zanuba Heap, a character from Septimus Heap
 Zelda Spellman, a character from Sabrina the Teenage Witch